Hugh Floyd (born January 18, 1941) is an American politician. He is a former member of the Georgia House of Representatives from the 99th District, serving from 2002 to 2017. He is a member of the Democratic party.

References

Living people
Democratic Party members of the Georgia House of Representatives
1941 births
21st-century American politicians
People from Parris Island, South Carolina